The Jessup River Wild Forest is a  Forest Preserve area in the towns of Lake Pleasant, Arietta, Indian Lake, and Wells in Hamilton County. NY-28 is the border of the forest to the north and NY-30 is the border of the forest in the southeast. West Canada Lake Wilderness Area is located to the west, Siamese Ponds Wilderness Area is located to the east, and the Silver Lake Wilderness Area to the south. Indian Lake, Piseco, Speculator, and Wells are located near or within the Jessup River Wild Forest. There are many trails to hike on, and many rivers and lakes to canoe or fish on within the forest which includes Jessup River. Part of the Northville-Placid Trail is located within the forest.

See also

 List of Wilderness Areas in the Adirondack Park

References

Wilderness areas in Adirondack Park
Protected areas of Hamilton County, New York